Robert Campbell (18 April 1951 – 28 May 2004) was an American artist and writer from Marshall, Texas. He studied art for two years at Stephen F. Austin State University, then moved to Los Angeles, where he showed at Gallerie Rabindra. In the 1980s and 1990s, he worked as a scenic painter on MTV music videos, film, and theater. He plays himself in the Kenny Loggins music video for "Vox Humana." In 2002, he cofounded Brass Tacks Press.

Selected titles
 On a Purple Spiral Floating by Robert Campbell & Pablo Capra (ed.) (Brass Tacks Press, 2016)
 Robert Campbell: Collected Works 1976-2004 by Robert Campbell & Pablo Capra (ed.) (Brass Tacks Press, 2022)

References

External links
 Official Brass Tacks Press website
 

1951 births
2004 deaths
20th-century American painters
20th-century American poets
21st-century American poets
African-American poets
Modern painters
Surrealist artists
American publishers (people)
People from Marshall, Texas
Stephen F. Austin State University alumni